The 1980 National League Championship Series was played between the Philadelphia Phillies and the Houston Astros from October 7 to 12. It was the 12th NLCS. Philadelphia won the series three games to two to advance to the World Series.  It was the first playoff series victory in Phillies history.  The Phillies went on to defeat the Kansas City Royals for their first World Series Championship. 

The 1980 National League Championship Series is remembered as the closest, most grueling playoff series in Major League Baseball history. The series went to its five-game limit, with the final four games requiring extra innings to determine a winner.

The two franchises would meet again in the 2022 World Series, nine years after the Astros switched to the American League.

Background
The 1980 National League pennant race was one of the most exciting races in baseball history, as both divisions came down to the final weekend. The NL East race featured the Pirates, the defending World Series Champions; the Phillies, who were hovering just over a .500 winning percentage and in third place until the middle of August; and the Expos, who were leading the division or within at least four games of first place throughout most of the season. The Pirates would fade at the end of the season and finish 83–79. The Phillies and the Expos were tied in the standings entering the final weekend of the 1980 season with a three game series set between the two clubs at Olympic Stadium. On October 4, with the Phillies holding a one-game lead in the standings, and with the score tied at four heading to the tenth, Mike Schmidt hit a blast deep into the seats in left field to give the Phillies a 6–4 lead and ultimate win. The win clinched the NL East for the Phillies and prevented a winner-take-all game for the NL East the following day.

The two parties in the NL West race were the Astros and Dodgers. The Astros were a very talented team with the additions of Joe Morgan and Nolan Ryan during the off-season, but a stroke to ace pitcher J.R. Richard in late July and inner turmoil threatened to tear the team apart. In his book, Joe Morgan – A Life in Baseball, Morgan recounted how he called a players-only meeting in August after a series against the Padres in San Diego. He challenged his teammates to be less selfish and he singled people out  and it worked. Immediately following the meeting, Houston went on a tear and gained a three game lead in the NL West. Everyone was happy, according to Morgan, except manager Bill Virdon, who felt Morgan had overstepped his bounds. Their relationship changed after that. As the team continued to surge, players would talk about how much of an influence Morgan was which made the problem worse. Virdon began benching Morgan late in games and it would come back to bite them later on. While the Phillies were putting their finishing touches on clinching the NL East during the last weekend of the season, the Astros had a meltdown at Dodger Stadium. All Houston had to do was win one game and they would qualify for their first ever post-season appearance. Instead, they were swept in three games by the second place Dodgers to force a one game playoff. 

More than 50,000 people packed Dodger Stadium on Monday, October 6 for the one-game playoff to determine the NL West champion. The Astros sent 19-game winner Joe Niekro to the mound, while the Dodgers countered with Dave Goltz, who signed as a free-agent in the 1979-1980 off-season. Goltz recorded double-digit wins for six straight seasons in Minnesota, but his first season in Dodger Blue was a disappointment, as he entered the most important game of the season with a 7–10 record. Houston would knock Goltz out the game early and go on to win 7–1, setting the stage for a Phillies versus Astros NL Championship Series.

Rosters

Philadelphia Phillies
Ramón Avilés, Bob Boone, Larry Bowa, Warren Brusstar, Marty Bystrom, Steve Carlton, Larry Christenson, Greg Gross, Greg Luzinski, Garry Maddox, Bake McBride, Tug McGraw, Keith Moreland, Dickie Noles, Ron Reed, Pete Rose, Dick Ruthven, Kevin Saucier, Mike Schmidt, Lonnie Smith, Manny Trillo, Del Unser, George Vukovich.

Houston Astros
Joaquín Andújar, Alan Ashby, Dave Bergman, Bruce Bochy, Enos Cabell, César Cedeño, José Cruz, Ken Forsch, Danny Heep, Art Howe, Frank LaCorte, Rafael Landestoy, Jeffrey Leonard, Joe Morgan, Joe Niekro, Terry Puhl, Luis Pujols, Craig Reynolds, Vern Ruhle, Nolan Ryan, Joe Sambito, Dave Smith, Denny Walling, Gary Woods.

Summary

Houston Astros vs. Philadelphia Phillies

Game summaries

Game 1

The 1980 NLCS featured Joe Morgan on the Astros and Pete Rose on the Phillies, the leadoff and 2-hole hitters in the  Big Red Machine batting line-up, who dominated baseball for much of the 1970s. 

Game 1 was the most ordinary contest of the series. Starters Ken Forsch and Steve Carlton dueled for the first five innings, with only one run scored by Houston in the third on an RBI single by Gary Woods. Philadelphia's Greg Luzinski essentially decided the game in the sixth when he homered after Pete Rose had singled. This was the only home run of the entire series. The Phillies added another run in the seventh on a run-scoring single by pinch-hitter Greg Gross. Tug McGraw relieved Carlton at the start of the eighth and allowed only a walk during the last two innings for the save. Despite pitching fairly well in a complete game effort, Forsch took the loss.

The Astros arrived in Philadelphia only hours before the first pitch after defeating the Los Angeles Dodgers at Dodger Stadium in a one-game playoff the previous afternoon to win the Western Division championship. 

This was the first home postseason win for the Phillies since the Game 1 of the 1915 World Series, ending a ten-game home postseason losing streak.

Game 2

Houston evened the series in Game 2, a seesaw contest that would prove typical of the series as a whole. Houston opened the scoring in the third when Terry Puhl singled home Craig Reynolds after a sacrifice bunt by Nolan Ryan. The Phillies took the lead with two runs in the fourth on RBIs from Greg Luzinski and Garry Maddox. Houston evened the score in the seventh when Ryan walked and was doubled home by Puhl, and went ahead in the eighth after Joe Morgan doubled and scored on a single by José Cruz.

After loading the bases in the seventh but failing to score, the Phillies got a run in the eighth to tie the game 3–3 when Maddox singled home pinch-runner Lonnie Smith. The Astros went 1–2–3 in the ninth but the Phillies loaded the bases with one out in their half of the inning on singles by Bake McBride, Mike Schmidt and Smith. But Manny Trillo, who would eventually win the series MVP award, struck out and Maddox fouled out to end the threat.

The tenth inning turned disastrous for the Phillies as Houston used three hits to score four runs, with an RBI single by Cruz, a run-scoring groundout by César Cedeño, and a two-run triple by Dave Bergman. The Phillies got an unearned run in the bottom of the inning on an error by Reynolds at shortstop. But Astros reliever Joaquín Andújar came in and held on for the save to tie the series at 1–1.

Game 3

Houston's Astrodome was always known as a pitcher's park, and the domed stadium lived up to its reputation when the series moved there for Game 3. The two teams' pitching staffs combined to yield only 13 hits and one run in the game's 11 innings. Houston's Joe Niekro pitched ten strong innings but missed out on what would have been a win, while Phillies closer Tug McGraw took the loss. Both teams did get men to third on a few occasions: Houston in the first and fourth and Philadelphia in the third. But the staffs held firm until the bottom of the 11th. Joe Morgan led off the inning for the Astros with a triple to right. After two intentional walks Denny Walling hit a sacrifice fly to bring home the game's only run and give Houston the victory. The Astros were now just one win away from the franchise's first appearance in the World Series.

Game 4

In what was by now a familiar pattern, Game 4 turned into a back-and-forth contest that wasn't decided until extra innings.

The fourth inning of this game was especially eventful. In the top, Bake McBride and Manny Trillo opened with back-to-back singles off Vern Ruhle. Garry Maddox then hit a low liner back to the mound that Ruhle reached down and appeared to catch (replays were inconclusive). At first, plate umpire Doug Harvey signaled "no catch", but then when Ruhle threw to first baseman Art Howe to either double off Trillo or retire Maddox (according to the call), Harvey called time to confer with the other umpires. Ed Vargo and Bob Engel concurred that Ruhle caught the ball, and Harvey changed his ruling. Howe, seeing McBride at third base, then ran down and touched second for an apparent triple play and the Astros left the field as the inning was apparently over. Phillies manager Dallas Green and the Phillie infielders (especially Pete Rose) heatedly protested that Ruhle trapped the ball. Harvey allowed McBride to return to second, determining that his original ruling of "no catch" caused McBride to run to third. (Trillo was out, of course, having been doubled off first in the normal flow of the play.) Astros manager Bill Virdon protested the decision to declare only two outs and McBride on second, but to no avail. The umpires then consulted with National League President Chub Feeney, who was seated in the first row behind home plate, and Feeney agreed with the ruling. Green and the Phillies then resumed their heated disagreement, and both the Phillies and the Astros decided to play the game under protest. After a total of 20 minutes' worth of arguing from both sides, Larry Bowa grounded out for the third out of the inning.

The bottom of the fourth featured two fielding gaffes by Phillie left-fielder Lonnie Smith as the Astros got their first run. Enos Cabell doubled to left on what appeared to be a catchable fly ball. Smith mistakenly turned to face the left field wall as if the ball would carom, but the ball instead dropped on the warning track a few feet away from him. After Joe Morgan grounded Cabell to third, Gary Woods walked. Howe then hit a fly ball to left that Smith caught as both runners tagged. As Smith attempted to throw home to retire Cabell, the ball slipped from his hand and Cabell scored. Woods reached second and attempted to advance to third on the miscue, but Smith recovered the ball and threw him out on a close play as the Astros protested once again.

The Astros got another run in the fifth as Luis Pujols tripled and scored on a single by Rafael Landestoy. In what would prove to be critical failings, the Astros loaded the bases in both the sixth and seventh but couldn't add to their lead. In the sixth, a run for the Astros was taken off the board when Woods left third base too early on a sacrifice fly attempt and the Phillies successfully appealed.

The Phillies took advantage by going ahead with three runs in the eighth. Pinch-hitter Greg Gross and Smith opened the inning with singles off Ruhle and Rose singled in Gross. Smith advanced to third and Rose to second on the throw to third. Mike Schmidt then beat out a grounder up the middle, scoring Smith to tie it and moving Rose to third. After McBride struck out, Trillo hit a sinking line drive that Jeffrey Leonard made a shoestring catch-on and Rose tagged and scored the go-ahead run. However, on yet another "catch/no catch" controversy, Schmidt was doubled off first (ending the inning), thinking Leonard trapped the ball.

The Astros didn't go quietly and leveled the score in the bottom of the ninth on an RBI single by Terry Puhl. But the tenth was ruinous for Houston. With two out and the score tied at 3–3, the Phillies' Greg Luzinski entered as a pinch-hitter and doubled home Rose with the go-ahead run on a close play at the plate, with Rose running over Astros catcher Bruce Bochy. Manny Trillo then singled home Luzinski with an insurance tally. The Astros went 1–2–3 in the bottom of the tenth, and the series was tied. This was Luzinski's second game-winning hit in the Championship Series, coming after a subpar regular season for the slugger.

Game 4 of the series was a Saturday afternoon affair that ran into the early evening of October 11. An NCAA football game between the University of Houston and Texas A&M had been scheduled to begin at 7:00 p.m. Rather than move the game to a different day or to another stadium, the schools elected to play the game at the Astrodome as scheduled. The conversion of the Astrodome from baseball to football took several hours and the football game did not kick off until 11:33 p.m. The game ended at 2:41 a.m. with the Houston Cougars taking a 17–13 victory over Texas A&M. The Astrodome crew then began work on converting the Dome back to a baseball setup for Game 5 of the NLCS.

Game 5

Game 5 capped the series in fitting fashion, with seemingly endless surprises and excitement. The Astros jumped to an early lead in the first on a run-scoring double by José Cruz. Philadelphia bounced back to take the lead on a two-run single by Bob Boone in the second. The Astros saw Luis Pujols and Enos Cabell thrown out at the plate in the second and fifth, but finally broke through to tie the game at 2 on an unearned run in the sixth, due to an error by Philadelphia's LF Greg Luzinski.

Houston took what seemed like a solid 5–2 lead in the seventh on an RBI single by Denny Walling, a wild pitch from Phillies reliever Larry Christenson, and a run-scoring triple by Art Howe. A three-run deficit in the eighth inning against Nolan Ryan seemed insurmountable. But the Phillies would not die. They loaded the bases with nobody out on three straight singles, including an infield hit by Bob Boone and a bunt single by Greg Gross. Two runs came in on a walk to Pete Rose and a ground-out by Keith Moreland. An RBI single by Del Unser tied the game at 5, and then series MVP Manny Trillo put the Phillies ahead with a two-run triple.

The Astros promptly came back to tie the game in the bottom of the eighth, with Rafael Landestoy and José Cruz each singling in a run. Neither team scored in the ninth, but the Phillies got doubles from Unser and Garry Maddox in the tenth to take an 8–7 lead. Philadelphia's Dick Ruthven retired the Astros in order in the bottom of the tenth the last out being a soft liner to Maddox, and the Phillies had won their first pennant since 1950. Philadelphia went on to defeat the Kansas City Royals four games to two in the World Series.

Composite box
1980 NLCS (3–2): Philadelphia Phillies over Houston Astros

Aftermath
The 1980 NL Championship Series is widely regarded as one of the most exciting postseason series in baseball history. The last four of its five games went into extra innings, which is the most extra-inning games of any post-season series. Four of its games featured lead changes, while the one game that did not went 11 innings and ended in a 1–0 Houston victory.

"I've never been through such excitement in all my life," said Astros’ outfielder José Cruz after the winner-take-all Game 5. Terry Puhl added, "Everybody thought we [Astros] were a team of destiny. They were wrong. The Phillies were a team of destiny in this series." The Phillies would go on the win their first World Series in franchise history, becoming the last original National League team to win a Fall Classic. 

The Astros could have possibility won this series and their first championship if J.R. Richard, one of baseball's dominant pitcher in this era, had not tragically suffered a stroke in the middle of the season. In 1981, Richard attempted a comeback with the Astros, however this failed because the stroke had slowed down his reaction time and weakened his depth perception. He spent the next few seasons in the minor leagues before being released by the Astros in 1984. After his professional baseball career ended, Richard became involved in unsuccessful business deals and went through two divorces, which led to him being homeless and destitute in 1994. Richard found solace in a local church and later became a Christian minister.  He was inducted into the Negro League Hall of Fame in 2018 and the  Astros inaugural Hall of Fame in 2019. Richard passed away in 2021 due to complications from COVID-19.

Then-Astros catcher Bruce Bochy was the manager of the San Francisco Giants in 2010 when his team beat the Philadelphia Phillies 30 years later in the NL Championship Series. Bochy was behind the plate for Houston in Game 4 of the 1980 NL Championship Series versus Philadelphia when Pete Rose ran him over to score the go-ahead run in the top of the tenth inning.

By 2013, the Astros had moved to the American League and they would not win a World Series until they beat the Los Angeles Dodgers in 2017. The Astros would win again in 2022, avenging their 1980 NL Championship Series loss by beating the Phillies in the World Series in six games.

References

External links
1980 NLCS at Baseball-reference

National League Championship Series
National League Championship Series
National League Championship Series
1980s in Philadelphia
National League Championship Series
National League Championship Series
National League Championship Series
Houston Astros postseason
Philadelphia Phillies postseason